Coy Burn is a stream that rises in the hills north of Banchory in Aberdeenshire, Scotland. Coy Burn discharges to the River Dee at Milton of Crathes.

History 
The Coy Burn along with certain other natural waters of Scotland has been under study for its role in Salmon spawning. A number of prehistorical features lie nearby including Balbridie and Bucharn to the south of the River Dee. Vicinity historical features include Crathes Castle, Maryculter House and Muchalls Castle.

See also
Balbridie

References

Rivers of Aberdeenshire